The 1950 UK & Ireland Greyhound Racing Year was the 25th year of greyhound racing in the United Kingdom and Ireland.

Roll of honour

Summary
The annual totalisator was £70,408,231, a fourth consecutive drop since 1946. Seventy-one of the tracks were affiliated to the National Greyhound Racing Club (NGRC) which accounted for £61,068,000 of the total. The drop at the 71 tracks constituted 18% and paid attendances were 21,549,000, a drop of 10%. The returns further increased the friction between the industry and the government, with the former blaming the tote tax cost of £9,182,000 in addition to normal income tax on other areas of the business.

Ballymac Ball continued his exceptional form from 1949 by winning the English Greyhound Derby.

Tracks
The Boyne Valley Greyhound Stadium in Navan and Spennymoor Greyhound Stadium both open.

Competitions
The News of the World in association with the National Greyhound Racing Club announced plans to sponsor a national intertrack competition  Ballymac Ball who had been phenomenal during the Laurels the year before and 1,000 Guineas and Trafalgar Cup champion Ballycurren Garrett.

Ballycurren Garrett made amends for his disappointing Derby showing when travelling to Cardiff Arms Park and lifting the Welsh Greyhound Derby crown. Drumgoon Boy was five lengths adrift in second and Red Wind finish fifth despite starting at odds of 11-10. The time of 29.22 recorded by Ballycurren Garrett broke the existing track record. In Scotland, the third Derby event of the year was won by Wembley’s Behattans Choice, who held off veteran West End Dasher for a comfortable win. Behattans Choice a brindle dog and Westend Dasher a fawn dog were both trained by Bob Burls and he made the decision to take the pair over to Ireland for the Irish Greyhound Derby.

The newly crowned Derby champion Ballymac Ball successfully defended his Laurels title and was then retired to stud.

News
A vaccine is eventually found for hard pad disease, better known as distemper. Francis Gentle, vice chairman of the Greyhound Racing Association (GRA) and chairman of the Association for the Protection for Copyright in Sport proposes to prohibit the televising of all sports until the law changes. The 1950 movie The Blue Lamp is filmed at White City.

Drumgoon Boy and Red Wind, two champions were now under the training of Fred Trevillion after their owner/trainer Frank Davis was undergoing an investigation in relation to 'ringing' (running a greyhound in a false name). Frank Davis was found guilty of running the brilliant Red Wind without proof of pedigree along with another greyhound called Rindiffin D. The court believed Red Wind to be a former Irish pup called Waggles, a fact disputed by Davis. Nevertheless Davis was imprisoned for fraud and all of his greyhounds disqualified by the NGRC.

The introduction of a new trainers licence went ahead; it was called a C Licence and would allow private trainers to run their greyhounds in graded racing at tracks in addition to the resident trainers. Oxford Stadium was the first track to experiment with the scheme. Also at Oxford the continuing problem of taxation was evident when they announced that during the first eleven months of the year they had paid £21,595 tote tax, £9,459 bookmaker tax and £4,152 entertainment duty forcing owner Leslie Calcutt to make the announcement that they would close during December until further notice.

The Instaprint photo finish and timer that was tested at Wimbledon Stadium was given the seal of approval to use throughout Britain  and weighing scales became mandatory at all tracks.

Frederick Johnson is finally issued a private trainers licence, the breeder from Tarpoley in Cheshire had been refused a licence since 1946. His Rushton News made the Irish Laurels final in 1948 and Johnson has plans to breed with him. He does breed and rear litter by Mad Tanist, out of Summer Frock which includes Rushton Smutty. Rushton News will soon sire a greyhound called Rushton Spot.

Ireland
Mayo dog Crossmolina Rambler claimed the 1950 Irish Greyhound Derby and Spanish Chestnut won a second successive Irish Laurels.

Principal UK races

+ Track Record

Totalisator Returns

The totalisator returns declared to the licensing authorities for the year 1950 are listed below. Tracks that did not have a totalisator in operation are not listed.

Summary

+ number of tracks include those without a tote in operation

References 

Greyhound racing in the United Kingdom
Greyhound racing in the Republic of Ireland
UK and Ireland Greyhound Racing Year
UK and Ireland Greyhound Racing Year
UK and Ireland Greyhound Racing Year
UK and Ireland Greyhound Racing Year